Copelatus externus is a species of diving beetle. It is part of the genus Copelatus of the subfamily Copelatinae in the family Dytiscidae. It was described by Theodor Franz Wilhelm Kirsch in 1873.

References

externus
Beetles described in 1873